Princess Frederica Amalia of Denmark and Norway (11 April 1649 – 30 October 1704) was the second daughter of King Frederick III of Denmark and Sophie Amalie of Brunswick-Lüneburg, and Duchess of Holstein-Gottorp from 1667 to 1695 as the consort of Duke Christian Albert.

Life 
 
Frederica Amalie was a daughter of King Frederick III of Denmark and his wife, Sophie Amalie of Brunswick-Lüneburg. Her father had been crowned king on 23 November 1648, about five months before she was born.

She was married at Glücksburg Castle on 24 October 1667 to Duke Christian Albert of Holstein-Gottorp as part of a peace treaty between Denmark and Holstein-Gottorp, but the hostile parties continued to fight. The marriage was unhappy, with Frederica Amalia often tormented by the frequent disagreements between her brother, Christian V of Denmark, and her spouse. She was reportedly well known to be badly treated by Christian Albert, while the Danish royal family gave her all sorts of personal privileges and proofs of affection.

The couple visited her sister, the Swedish queen Ulrika Eleonora. Her visits to Sweden inspired great parties and festivities at the otherwise strict Swedish court, and were much appreciated. She became a widow in 1695. As her sons were also anti-Danish, the conflict between Denmark and Holstein-Gottorp continued to put her in a difficult position also as a widow; when she died in her residence in Kiel in 1704, a conflict between Holstein-Gottorp and Denmark about the proper way to ring the bells at her funeral almost provoked war between the two states.

Issue 
With Christian Albert, Duke of Holstein-Gottorp, she had four children:

 Sophie Amalie (19 January 1670 – 27 February 1710), married on 7 July 1695 to Duke Augustus William of Brunswick-Lüneburg. No issue.
 Frederick (18 October 1671 – 19 July 1702), succeeded his father as Duke Frederick IV of Holstein-Gottorp.
 Christian August (11 January 1673 – 24 April 1726), succeeded his brother as Duke Christian August of Holstein-Gottorp. Grandfather of Catherine the Great
 Marie Elisabeth (21 March 1678 – 17 July 1755), Abbess of Quedlinburg.

Ancestors

References
  Article in the Dansk biografisk Lexicon
 Lindqvist, Herman. Storhet och fall. Sweden: Bokförlaget Pan, 2000 (1997). Vol 4 of Historien om Sverige. 10 vols. 1992–2002. . (Swedish)

External links

|-

Duchesses of Holstein-Gottorp
House of Oldenburg in Denmark
House of Holstein-Gottorp
1649 births
1704 deaths
Danish princesses
Norwegian princesses
Incidents of domestic violence
Violence against women in Europe
Daughters of kings